Thymichthys is a genus in the handfish family Brachionichthyidae. Like other handfishes, they move by means of walking on their pectoral fins, which resemble hands.

Thymichthys is distinguished by its wart-like protuberances, strongly demarcated sensory scales, and dermal appendages. The coloring is a bright pattern of blotches, spots, and reticulations.

The generic epithet is derived from the Greek thymos (warty excrescence) and ichthys (fish).

Species
The currently recognized species in this genus are:
 Thymichthys politus Last & Gledhill 2009 (Red handfish)
 Thymichthys verrucosus (McCulloch & Waite, 1918) (Warty handfish)

References

External links 
 National Geographic, including photos

Brachionichthyidae
Marine fish genera
 
Taxa named by Peter R. Last